Pointe de Ronce is a mountain of Savoie, France. It lies in the Mont Cenis range.

Features
It is located near the Mont Cenis Pass and overlooks the village of Lanslebourg in Haute-Maurienne. A wide circus, called 'Plan des Cavales', opens on the west side towards the Lac du Mont-Cenis.

From the summit, a long ridge is going south-east to Pointe du Lamet, then to Rocciamelone.

In the mountain slopes exposed to the north, recline glacier de l'Arcelle Neuve and glacier du Vieux.

Given the height of the mountain and the special isolation of its summit, one gets a wide view of the surrounding mountains.

Climb to the summit
The access to the summit generally begins from Lake of Mont-Cenis. Arrived in Plan des Fontainettes (2,090 m) starting at the characteristic pyramid-shaped church, walk to Fort de Ronce. Near the Fort, start heading north on a long path that goes with large coils to reach Col du Lou (3,042 m). From the pass, follow the ridge eastwards overcoming various ridges, the largest of which is Signal du Grand Mont-Cenis (3,377 m), and finally to the summit ridge.

Downhill you can retrace the ascent route or you can go down the southeastern slope of the mountain, through the Pointe du Lamet, and then go down to the Lake of Mont-Cenis.

Maps
 French  official cartography (Institut géographique national - IGN); on-line version: www.geoportail.fr
 Istituto Geografico Centrale - Carta dei sentieri e dei rifugi 1:50.000 nr 2 Valli di Lanzo e Moncenisio

External links

 
 

Alpine three-thousanders
Mountains of Savoie
Mountains of the Alps